Giselle Andrea Kañevsky (born August 4, 1985, in Buenos Aires) is an Argentine field hockey player who plays as a defender on the Argentina national team.

Kañevsky is Jewish   She started playing at age seven in Los Cardales Club, moving to Náutico Hacoaj three years later. In 2005, she was part of the National Junior Championship, and a year later had her debut with the senior team, finishing third at the World Cup.

In August 2008, she won the bronze medal with the national field hockey team at the 2008 Summer Olympics in Beijing. In September of the same year she moved to the Netherlands to play with the team of Haagsche Delftsche Mixed Hockey Club (HDM). In 2010, she won the World Cup held in Rosario, Argentina.

In 2019, she returned to the national team after an eight-year gap under the coaching of Carlos Retegui.

See also
List of select Jewish field hockey players

References

External links
 
 
 
 
 Beijing 2008 Olympic Games
 Confederación Argentina de Hockey (Argentine Hockey Confederation) 

1985 births
Living people
Argentine Jews
Argentine female field hockey players
Las Leonas players
Olympic field hockey players of Argentina
Field hockey players at the 2007 Pan American Games
Field hockey players at the 2008 Summer Olympics
Olympic bronze medalists for Argentina
Argentine people of Russian-Jewish descent
Field hockey players from Buenos Aires
Jewish sportspeople
Olympic medalists in field hockey
Jewish Argentine sportspeople
Medalists at the 2008 Summer Olympics
Pan American Games gold medalists for Argentina
Pan American Games medalists in field hockey
South American Games gold medalists for Argentina
South American Games medalists in field hockey
Competitors at the 2006 South American Games
Field hockey players at the 2019 Pan American Games
Medalists at the 2007 Pan American Games
Medalists at the 2019 Pan American Games
21st-century Argentine women